Lisa Langlois (born March 15, 1959) is a Canadian actress, who has appeared in movies, television and theater.

Life and career
Langlois was born in North Bay, Ontario. spent her childhood years in Hamilton, Ontario, where she attended a French language school becoming fluent in French. In 1974 she represented Hamilton in the Miss Teen Canada beauty pageant, where she finished second. Langlois graduated from McMaster University in Hamilton.

She made her film debut in Claude Chabrol's mystery Blood Relatives (1978) opposite Donald Sutherland.  Chabrol also cast her in his next feature, Violette Nozière (1978). Langlois made a number of other films in Canada, including the thriller Phobia (1980), directed by John Huston.

She appeared in another 1980 film, Klondike Fever, and played leading roles in three films that have acquired cult followings: the horror film Happy Birthday to Me (1981), the teen actioner Class of 1984 (1982) (co-starring a young Michael J. Fox), and the killer rat shocker Deadly Eyes (1982).

After this work in Paris and Toronto, Langlois moved to Los Angeles to pursue American projects. She appeared in two Paramount Pictures comedy features: The Man Who Wasn't There (1983), a 3-D production, and National Lampoon's Joy of Sex (1984), directed by Martha Coolidge.  In 1985 Langlois co-starred in the romantic comedy The Slugger's Wife, where she played a struggling singer and performed her own musical numbers after auditioning for Quincy Jones. She made guest appearances on television programs such as Murder, She Wrote in 1986, and she performed on stage in the La Jolla Playhouse's production of Once in a Lifetime in 1988. She played the heroine in Roger Corman's horror film The Nest (1988) and co-starred in a made for TV movie, The Strange Case of Dr. Jekyll and Mr. Hyde (1989).

During the 1990s Langlois moved back to Canada.  She worked steadily including parts in the action pictures The White Tiger (1995) and The Final Cut (1995), alongside Sam Elliott.  She made appearances in the television series Beyond Belief: Fact or Fiction? (1998), Vengeance Unlimited (1999), and Relic Hunter (2000). After a brief hiatus she returned to the Los Angeles stage in 2004, starring in Jungle Express in Malibu.

More recently, Langlois had a co-starring role in The Perfect Marriage (2006), a thriller that premiered on Lifetime Television; in 2007 she had a recurring role in the TV series The L Word. In 2010, she appeared in Summer Eleven directed by Joseph Kelly, her former co-star from Deadly Eyes (1982).

Langlois has a son, Emerson.

Filmography

Movies

Television

References

External links
The Beauty & the Beasts: An Interview with Lisa Langlois

1959 births
Living people
Actresses from Ontario
Canadian beauty pageant contestants
Canadian film actresses
Canadian television actresses
Franco-Ontarian people
McMaster University alumni
People from North Bay, Ontario
20th-century Canadian actresses
21st-century Canadian actresses